The Savannah River Parkway is a four-lane divided highway that roughly parallels the Savannah River in the U.S. state of Georgia, that exists in two distinct segments. The roadway is being considered for inclusion as part of Interstate 3 (I-3), which ultimately is planned to travel from Savannah to Knoxville, Tennessee.

Route description

Western branch 
The western branch follows US 25/US 301/SR 73 from I-16 south-southwest of Statesboro into the southern parts of the city. It then follows US 25 Byp./SR 67 Byp. around the western edge of the city, then US 25/US 80/SR 26/SR 67 northwest to Hopeulikit, where US 80/SR 26 leave the roadway. The highway travels to the north-northwest to Millen, picking up SR 121 and SR 23 along the way.

Eastern branch 
The eastern branch begins at an as-yet undetermined point in downtown Savannah. It follows SR 21 out of the city. It has an interchange with I-95 in Port Wentworth and follows SR 21 northwest to Millen.

Combined segment 
In Millen, both branches merge and follow US 25/SR 121 northward to an interchange with I-520 in Augusta. They continue on to the point where US 25/SR 121 begin a concurrency with US 1/US 78/US 278/SR 10 (Gordon Highway).

Future

The Savannah River Parkway is proposed to be included in the future I-3, which has been planned to connect the Savannah and Knoxville metropolitan areas.

See also
 
 
 Interstate 14
 Fall Line Freeway

References

External links
 Savannah River Parkway Fact Sheet on Georgia Department of Transportation website
 2005 SAFETEA-LU legislation from the Library of Congress
 Interstate Guide Proposed Interstates: I-3

Roads in Georgia (U.S. state)
Savannah metropolitan area
Streets and parkways in the Augusta metropolitan area
Proposed state highways in the United States
Parkways in the United States
Freeways in the United States